Wong Shik-Ling (also known as S. L. Wong) published a romanisation scheme accompanying a set of phonetic symbols for Cantonese based on International Phonetic Alphabet (IPA) in the book A Chinese Syllabary Pronounced according to the Dialect of Canton.

Phonology
Cantonese, like a number of other varieties of Chinese is monosyllabic.  Each syllable is divided into initial (consonant), final (vowel and following consonant) and tone.

Finals
Chinese phonology traditionally stresses on finals because it is related to rhymes in the composition of poems, proses and articles.  There are 53 finals in Cantonese.

Vowels
The ten basic vowel phoneme symbols [a], [ɐ], [ei], [ɛ], [i], [ou], [ɔ], [œ], [u] and [y] in the scheme mean following: 

For detail explanation of the phonetic system, see S. L. Wong (phonetic symbols)#Vowels.

Falling diphthong finals
All vowel phonemes except a formed vowel 9 finals themselves.

Some vowel phonemes can followed by vowel phonemes -i, -u or -ue to form 8 falling diphthong finals:

 The combination of eu and ue is euue.  The double u is reduced to a single u and the combination becomes eue.

For detail explanation of the phonetic system, see S. L. Wong (phonetic symbols)#Falling diphthong finals.

Nasal phoneme finals
The nasal consonants [m], [n] and [ŋ] in finals can be written as:

Some vowel phonemes can followed by nasal consonants -m, -n or -ng to form 17 nasal phoneme finals:

For detail explanation of the phonetic system, see S. L. Wong (phonetic symbols)#Nasal phoneme finals.

Plosive phoneme finals 
The plosive final can be written [p], [t] and [k] as:

Some vowel phonemes can followed by unaspirated plosive consonants -p, -t or -k to form 17 plosive phoneme finals:

For detail explanation of the phonetic system, see S. L. Wong (phonetic symbols)#Plosive phoneme finals.

Nasal consonantoids fully voiced finals
For the nasal consonantoids fully voiced finals

[m] and [ŋ] in voiced form [m̩] and [ŋ̩] are also two finals in Cantonese.

For detail explanation of the phonetic system, see S. L. Wong (phonetic symbols)#Nasal consonantoids fully voiced finals.

Initials
Initials are made up of consonants.  Most of characters are preceding finals with initials while some characters are pronounced without initials.  There are 19 initials in total.

For detail explanation of the phonetic system, see S. L. Wong (phonetic symbols)#Initials.

Tones
There are basically nine tones in Cantonese.  Tones play an important role to distinguish meanings in Cantonese.  Tones also forms melodies in poem and prose composition.

There are two ways to mark tones in the scheme. One is by number and another by marks.

It is hard to type the tones by typewriters.  It therefore simply uses the one in the phonetic symbols for reference.

For detail explanation of the phonetic system, see S. L. Wong (phonetic symbols)#Tones.

See also
 S. L. Wong (phonetic symbols)

References

External links
 Cukda Cantonese IME

Languages of Hong Kong
Cantonese language
Cantonese romanisation